USS Sussex (AK-213) was an  that was constructed for the US Navy during the closing period of World War II. She was retained by the Navy for post-war service, including that in the Korean War theatre where she earned three battle stars and then returned home for deactivation.

Construction
The second ship to be so named by the Navy. Sussex was laid down under US Maritime Commission (MARCOM) contract, MC hull 2167, on 3 October 1944, by the Leathem D. Smith Shipbuilding Company, Sturgeon Bay, Wisconsin; launched on 3 February 1945; sponsored by Mrs. Carl O. Rydhelm; and acquired by the Navy in July 1945.

Service history

Operation by the Coast Guard
She was operated by the United States Coast Guard until the spring 1946, and on 23 May 1946, was placed in the reserve fleet. She was reacquired by the Navy on 27 February 1947; and commissioned on 27 May 1947.

Post-World War II service
Assigned to the Alaskan Sea Frontier, Sussex sailed to Seattle, Washington, in late June, loaded cargo, and made her maiden voyage to Alaskan ports for the United States Navy. After making calls at Adak and Kodiak, she returned to Seattle on 25 August 1947. From that date until December 1950, the ship made 16 voyages from Seattle to various Alaskan ports carrying supplies to bases and installations there.

Korean War service
From January to July 1951, Sussex provided logistic support for the mid-Pacific Trust Territories. From August 1951 to January 1952, she operated in the Korean war zone, moving supplies and munitions to United Nations ships and bases. The ship was busy transporting cargo from Japanese ports to such places as Pusan, Suyong, and Inchon.

On 5 February 1952, Sussex stood out of Yokosuka en route to Bremerton, Washington, for a general overhaul. She departed Bremerton on 12 May 1952 and proceeded via Pearl Harbor and Midway Island to Japan. The cargo ship arrived at Sasebo, Japan, on 30 June and resumed her runs to Korea; but this time, she also included Okinawa, Taiwan, and the Pescadores Islands among her supply points.

Sussex returned to Pearl Harbor on 15 December 1952 and, until March 1954, supplied bases at Midway Island, Kwajalein, Saipan, and Guam. She arrived at Yokosuka on 14 March and operated from that port until 19 October 1954 when she returned to Pearl Harbor to resume supplying mid-Pacific Ocean bases. She continued this duty, operating from Pearl Harbor, until 7 May 1958 when she moved her base of operations to Iwakuni, Japan.

Decommissioning
Sussex steamed into Yokosuka on 21 November 1959 and was decommissioned on 5 December 1959. She was struck from the Navy List on 1 January 1960 and sold to the Hugo Neu Steel Products Corp., New York, on 27 July 1960 for scrap.

Awards and honors 
Sussex received three battle stars for service during the Korean War:
 UN Summer-Fall Offensive
Battle of the Punchbowl
 Second Korean Winter
 Korean Defense Summer-Fall 1952
Operation Showdown
Qualified Sussex personnel were eligible for the following:
 American Campaign Medal
 World War II Victory Medal
 National Defense Service Medal
 Korean Service Medal (3)
 United Nations Service Medal
 Republic of Korea War Service Medal

Notes 

Citations

Bibliography 

Online resources

External links
 

 

Alamosa-class cargo ships
Sussex County, Delaware
Sussex County, New Jersey
Sussex County, Virginia
Ships built in Sturgeon Bay, Wisconsin
1945 ships
World War II auxiliary ships of the United States
Ammunition ships of the United States Navy
Korean War auxiliary ships of the United States